Antonino Bonaventura Gargiulo (March 26, 1843 – May 9, 1904) was an Italian Capuchin friar, editor and publisher, and Roman Catholic Bishop of the Roman Catholic Diocese of San Severo, Italy.

References 

1843 births
1904 deaths
19th-century Italian Roman Catholic bishops
Bishops in Apulia
People from Sorrento
Capuchins